Turpentine Creek Wildlife Refuge (TCWR) is a 459-acre (186 ha) wildlife refuge for abused, abandoned, and neglected big cats.

The Eureka Springs, Arkansas, refuge houses 100 or more animals. It mainly specializes in tigers, but there are also lions, leopards, cougars, bobcats, black bears, ligers, servals, a monkey, a coatimundi and a grizzly bear.

In 2015 Turpentine Creek reached Verified Status from the Global Federation of Animal Sanctuaries.

Turpentine Creek is a member of the American Association of Zookeepers.

Expansion 

In 2012 Turpentine Creek rescued 34 big cats from a breeding facility. To accommodate this massive number of cats a secondary area was built, which is now referred to as "Rescue Ridge". Many of the cats rescued from the facility were not used to human contact. To reduce stress on the animals this area is not open to the public.

Turpentine Creek spent the past few years working to expand the refuge. The original area, now referred to as the "Compound" that contained smaller cages with cement flooring has been emptied. Turpentine has built spacious, grassy habitats ranging in size from 1/4 acre to 1/2 acre for the animals to live in over the past 14 years.

By September 16, 2015, all of the small concrete cages that used to make up the majority of Turpentine Creek were emptied. On September 17, 2015, demolition of the old "compound" area began.

Turpentine Creek has an on-site Veterinary Hospital for the animals who reside at Turpentine Creek. The vet hospital is on Turpentine Creek's property and makes giving the animals medical attention easier. Having a vet hospital on-site is less stress to the animals and reduces the risk of the animals, or any human around them, from getting injured.[2][3][non-primary source needed]

References

External links 

 

Geography of Carroll County, Arkansas
Wildlife sanctuaries of the United States
Tourist attractions in Carroll County, Arkansas
Buildings and structures in Eureka Springs, Arkansas